Stony Point Fashion Park is a high-end outdoor shopping center in Richmond, Virginia that opened in 2003. The center currently maintains the anchor tenants Dillard's and Saks Fifth Avenue.

Stony Point is the only mall in the region that offers a dog-friendly environment along with comfort stations located throughout the center.

Rivalry with Short Pump
The mall was the result of a rivalry between mall developer Taubman Centers and ForestCity, both who sought to build a new upscale center in Richmond. The battle was eventually settled in court, which ultimately saw Taubman building Stony Point, and ForestCity building the rival, two-story Short Pump Town Center, which is nearly two times the size of Stony Point. Short Pump broke ground in November 2000, but Stony Point didn't break ground until February 2002. Stony Point finally opened on September 18, 2003, the day Hurricane Isabel made landfall in nearby Outer Banks.

References

External links
 Official site

Taubman Centers
Shopping malls in Richmond, Virginia
Shopping malls in Virginia
Buildings and structures in Richmond, Virginia
Tourist attractions in Richmond, Virginia
Shopping malls established in 2003
2003 establishments in Virginia